The 1929 DePaul Blue Demons football team was an American football team that represented DePaul University as an independent during the 1929 college football season. In its fifth season under head coach Eddie Anderson, the team compiled a 2–5 record and was outscored by a total of 124 to 114.

Schedule

References

DePaul
DePaul Blue Demons football seasons
DePaul Blue Demons football